Class I PI 3-kinases are a subgroup of the enzyme family, phosphoinositide 3-kinase that possess a common protein domain structure, substrate specificity, and method of activation. Class I PI 3-kinases are further divided into two subclasses, class IA PI 3-kinases and class IB PI 3-kinases.

Class IA PI 3-kinases
Class IA PI 3-kinases are activated by receptor tyrosine kinases (RTKs).

There are three catalytic subunits that are classified as class IA PI 3-kinases:
p110α
p110β
p110δ

There are currently five regulatory subunits that are known to associate with class IA PI 3-kinases catalytic subunits:

p85α and p85β
p55α and p55γ
p50α

Class IB PI 3-kinases
Class IB PI 3-kinases are activated by G-protein-coupled receptors (GPCRs).

The only known class IB PI 3-kinase catalytic subunit is p110γ.

There are two known regulatory subunits for p110γ:
p101
p84/ p87PIKAP.

See also
 Phosphoinositide 3-kinase#Class I
 Phosphoinositide 3-kinase inhibitor

References

EC 2.7.1